The 1960 European Judo Championships were the 10th edition of the European Judo Championships, and were held in Amsterdam in the Netherlands from 13 to 15 May 1960.

Medal winners

References

External links

 

European Judo Championships
E
Judo competitions in the Netherlands
European Judo Championships
International sports competitions hosted by the Netherlands
Judo
Judo